Pleurotomella striatulata is an extinct species of sea snail, a marine gastropod mollusk in the family Raphitomidae.

Description

Distribution
Fossils of this marine species were found in Miocene strata in Aquitaine, France

References

 Lamarck (J.-B.), 1822 Histoire naturelle des animaux sans vertèbres, présentant les caractères généraux et particuliers de ces animaux, leur distinction, leurs classes, leurs familles, leurs genres, et la citation des principales espèces qui s'y rapportent, t. 7, p. 1-711
 Deshayes (G.-P.), 1843 Histoire des Mollusques. In : Deshayes, G.-P. & Milne Edwards, H. Histoire naturelle des Animaux sans vertèbres présentant les caractères généraux et particuliers de ces animaux,... par LAMARCK, deuxième édition, revue et augmentée, t. 9, p. 1-728

striatulata
Gastropods described in 1822